Chester Ambrose Reynolds (September 24, 1902 – May 1, 1983) was a provincial politician from Alberta, Canada. He served as a member of the Legislative Assembly of Alberta from 1940 to 1944, sitting as a Social Credit member from the constituency of Stettler.

Early life and education
Reynolds was born September 24, 1902 in Chicago, Illinois to W. F. Reynolds (1863–1949) and Elizabeth ( Crowe; 1872–1949). The family  immigrated to Canada in 1906; he was educated in Gadsby, Alberta.

Political career
Reynolds was elected in the 1940 Alberta general election to the 9th Alberta Legislature for the constituency of Stettler as a member of the Social Credit Party. Reynolds received slightly over 50 percent of the vote, defeating his Independent opponent L. V. Lohr by 817 votes, and the Co-operative Commonwealth candidate H. H. Turner by 1,884 votes. Reynolds did not contest the 1944 Alberta general election.

Personal life
On June 29, 1938, Reynolds married Helen Long of Lacombe, Alberta. 
He is the grandfather of actor Ryan Reynolds.

References

External links

1983 deaths
1902 births
Alberta Social Credit Party MLAs
People from the County of Stettler No. 6
Canadian people of Irish descent